Aztecacris is a genus of spur-throated grasshoppers in the family Acrididae. There are three described species in Aztecacris.

Species
These three species belong to the genus Aztecacris:
 Aztecacris gloriosa (Hebard, 1935) i b (atascosa gem grasshopper)
 Aztecacris laevis (Rehn, J.A.G., 1900) c g
 Aztecacris variabilis (Rehn, J.A.G., 1904) c g
Data sources: i = ITIS, c = Catalogue of Life, g = GBIF, b = Bugguide.net

References

Further reading

 
 

Melanoplinae
Articles created by Qbugbot
Taxa named by H. Radclyffe Roberts